DPGC: U Know What I'm Throwin' Up is the fourth studio album by rapper Daz Dillinger, which features Snoop Dogg on most of the album along with E-White, Soopafly & Bad Azz taking shots at Suge Knight, Kurupt & Death Row affiliates. This was Daz Dillinger's first album under Gangsta Advisory Records.

Track listing
"Bigg Snoop Dogg Intro" (featuring Snoop Dogg) – 0:32
"I'll Beacho Azz" (featuring Soopafly) – 4:38
"Public Service Announcement" (Interlude) (featuring Snoop Dogg) – 0:15
"U Ain't Shit" (Death Row Diss) (featuring Bad Azz) – 3:28
"WBALLZ" (Interlude) (featuring WBALLZ) – 0:21
"Dogg Catcha" (featuring Soopafly) – 4:50
"Snoopy Collins" (Interlude) (featuring Snoopy Collins) – 0:10
"All Night Long" – 3:59
"It's Dat Gangsta Shit" (featuring Snoop Dogg) – 4:08
"Skirt Out" – 3:51
"Snoop (Interlude): Suck Me" (featuring Snoop Dogg) – 0:07
"Don't Stop" (featuring Soopafly) – 3:48
"Snoop (Interlude): Quit Playin'" (featuring Snoop Dogg) – 0:16
"Can't Stop That Gangsta Shit" – 3:55
"Snoop (Interlude): Kick Some Gangsta Shit" (featuring Snoop Dogg) – 0:08
"Deez Niggaz Trippin'" (featuring Soopafly) – 4:14
"Introduction 2 Mayhem" (featuring Soopafly) – 3:18
"WBALLZ" (Interlude) (featuring WBALLZ) – 0:06
"Round N Round We Go" (featuring Shon Don) – 4:07
"DPGC: U Know What I'm Throwin' Up" (featuring Snoop Dogg & Goldie Loc) – 5:06
"Pimpin' Olympics" (Interlude) – 0:30
"Ain't Nothin' But a Gangsta Party" (part 2) (featuring Whiteboy Ryan) – 4:49
"I Got Dat Fire" (Interlude) – 0:30
"I Got Dat Fire" (featuring Snoop Dogg, E-White & Uncle Reo) – 4:07
"Snoop (Interlude): Reminisce" (featuring Snoop Dogg) – 0:37
"World So Cold" (featuring Shon Don) – 4:26
"A Message To Ricardo Brown" (Interlude) – 1:51
"Church" (Interlude) – 0:41
"Who Dem Niggaz" – 4:27
"Let's Roll" (featuring Shon Don & Crystal) – 3:26
"A Message From Delmar Arnaud" (Outro) – 1:16

Personnel 

Dave Arron – Mastering
Dat Nigga Daz – Producer
Def Jef – Producer
E-White – Performer
Fredwreck Nassar – Producer
Soopafly – Producer
Meech Wells – Producer

Charts

References

2003 albums
Daz Dillinger albums
Albums produced by Daz Dillinger
Albums produced by Fredwreck
Albums produced by Soopafly